Cappont (often spelled Cap-Pont) is a neighbourhood in Lleida, Catalonia, Spain.

It stretches along the eastern bank of the Segre river. Cappont contains the city's largest park, the Camps Elisis, and a University of Lleida campus. 

The district had 11,612 inhabitants as of 2008.

See also
Districts and neighbourhoods of Lleida

Neighbourhoods of Lleida